The 1985 WCT World Doubles, also known by its sponsored name WCT Fuji Film World Doubles Championships, was a men's tennis tournament played on indoor carpet courts at Royal Albert Hall in London, England that was part of the 1985 Nabisco Grand Prix. It was the tour finals for the doubles season of the WCT Tour section. It was the 13th edition of the tournament and was held from 1 January through 6 January 1985. Ken Flach and Robert Seguso won the title.

Final

Doubles
 Ken Flach /  Robert Seguso defeated  Heinz Günthardt /  Balázs Taróczy 6–3, 3–6, 6–3, 6–0

References

External links
 ITF tournament edition details

World Championship Tennis World Doubles
WCT World Doubles
WCT